Prince Kūhiō Plaza is a single-level regional shopping mall in Hilo, Hawaii. It is the largest enclosed mall on the Island of Hawaii. Anchor stores are two Macy's stores, TJ Maxx, and Petco. Other major tenants include a 9-screen movie theatre and Longs Drugs. Sears was an anchor of the plaza until closing in 2021.

The mall is named for Prince Jonah Kuhio Kalanianaole, who served as Congressional Delegate from 1903 to 1922.

History

In September 1977, the Department of Hawaiian Home Lands offered to lease  of land at the intersection of Pūʻāinakō Street and Kanoelehua Avenue (part of the Hawaii Belt Road) for development into retail space, which had been lacking in the area. Orchid Isle Group, the sole bidder for the property, signed a 53-year lease on October 28, 1977.

The mall opened in 1985.

On August 5, 2002, General Growth acquired the 50% interest in the mall that was owned by Homart Development Company, bringing its ownership in the mall to 100%.

In 2001, Macy's acquired the Liberty House store at the mall, followed by JCPenney two years later for the men's, children's, and home store.

In 2004, the owner of the shopping center was sued by Longs Drugs for allowing a Safeway to be constructed at the mall.

In 2013, First Hawaiian Bank opened a branch at the mall.

In 2015, Old Navy and Pier 1 Imports opened stores in the mall.

On January 29, 2021, it was announced that Sears would be closing as part of a plan to close 23 stores nationwide. The store will close on April 18, 2021.

References

External links

Brookfield Properties
Shopping malls in Hawaii
Buildings and structures in Hilo, Hawaii
Tourist attractions in Hawaii County, Hawaii
Shopping malls established in 1985
1985 establishments in Hawaii